Nawab Kapura Singh Brar (16251708) was the accredited progenitor of both the Faridkot and Kot Kapura minor Phulkian houses. Also responsible for founding the town of Kot Kapura in 1661.

Life 

Kapura Singh was born in Panjgrain, Punjab, to Chaudury Lala Brar in 1625. Chaudury Lala Brar was the younger brother of Nawab Bhallan Chand Brar, the head of the Brar clan and an ardent follower of Guru Hargobind. Bhallan died issueless in 1634, being succeeded by Kapura, his nephew. Kapura was then succeeded by his elder son Sukhia Singh Brar.

During his reign over the Brar clan and jagirdari territories in the area around Kot kapura, the fort of Kot Kapura was constructed in 1661. Kapura also engaged in incessant warfare with the neighbouring Rajput clans over historic territory disputes and due to his conquest of their jagirdari holds.

Baptism 

Kapura Singh supported Guru Gobind Singh Ji in the Battle of Muktsar, originally known as the battle of Khidrana (Khidrana di jang),  with men and military vantage. After this, Kapura Singh was baptised by the hands of Guru Gobind Singh Ji in 1705. He was given a khanda (double-edged sword) and Dhal shield.

Death 

Kapura Singh Brar was killed by the Manj Rajput chief, Isa Khan, in 1708. An on-going feud between the Phulkian houses and multiple Rajput houses had led to numerous prior altercations and conflicts, ultimately leading to the assassination of Kapura Singh as well. This assassination was avenged by Kapura Singhs's sons Sukhia Singh, Mukhia Singh and Sema Singh.

References 

1625 births
1708 deaths